My Teenage Daughter, later Teenage Bad Girl, is a 1956 British drama film directed by Herbert Wilcox and starring Anna Neagle, Sylvia Syms and Norman Wooland. The screenplay concerns a mother who tries to deal with her teenage daughter's descent into delinquency. It was intended as a British response to Rebel Without a Cause. It was the last commercially successful film made by Wilcox.

Plot
Valerie Carr is a widowed magazine editor who lives in London and has two teenage daughters, Jan and Poppet. Jan falls for the wealthy Tony Ward Black, who takes her dancing and for drives in his Bentley. Valeria gets a job editing a magazine for teenagers.

Cast
 Anna Neagle – Valerie Carr
 Sylvia Syms – Janet Carr
 Norman Wooland – Hugh Manning
 Wilfrid Hyde-White – Sir Joseph
 Kenneth Haigh – Tony Ward Black
 Julia Lockwood – Poppet Carr
 Helen Haye – Aunt Louisa
 Josephine Fitzgerald – Aunt Bella
 Wanda Ventham – Gina
 Michael Shepley – Sir Henry
 Avice Landone - Barbara
 Michael Meacham – Mark
 Edie Martin – Miss Ellis
 Ballard Berkeley – Magistrate
 Arthur Mullard - Club Bouncer (uncredited)
 Myrette Morven – Anne
 Grizelda Harvey – Miss Bennett
 Betty Cooper – Celia
 Daphne Cave – Deirdre
 Launce Maraschal – Senator

Production
Neagle and Wilcox commissioned playwright Felicity Douglas to write a script about the generation gap. It was known during filming as I Have a Teenaged Daughter.

Janette Scott and Shirley Eaton were announced as possible's to play the daughter of Anna Neagle. Wilcox ended up casting Sylvia Syms after seeing her in a television play, The Romantic Young Lady. She recalled, "I was crashingly ignorant and very young, and Anna and Herbert cosseted me and spoiled me. They made my part bigger as I went along... Their generosity was incredible. They didn't play me much but it was more than I was paid for my subsequent films [under a long-term contract with Associated British]."
 
Julia Lockwood, who plays Anna Neagle's youngest daughter, was the daughter of Margaret Lockwood.

Reception
Variety called it "an unabashed sentimental drama, obviously conceived as unsophisticated entertainment... should prove a stout b.o. proposition where the name value of Anna Neagle has potent marquee appeal."

Filmink said the film "was described as Britain’s answer to Rebel Without a Cause, and in a way that’s true, in that it’s about a middle-class teen going off the rails, although it pays far more attention to the adult characters than the Nick Ray-James Dean classic.

Syms said when the film came out "I was, as they say, an overnight sensation" but she "had saddled myself with a seven year contract" with Associated British.

References

Bibliography
 Harper, Sue & Porter, Vincent. British Cinema of the 1950s: The Decline of Deference. Oxford University Press, 2007.

External links

My Teenage Daughter at Letterbox DVD
My Teenage Daughter at BFI
My Teenage Daughter at Reel Streets

1956 films
1956 drama films
Films directed by Herbert Wilcox
1950s coming-of-age drama films
British coming-of-age drama films
1950s English-language films
1950s British films
British black-and-white films